HMS Moorsom may refer to more than one ship of the British Royal Navy:

, an Admiralty M-class destroyer launched in 1914 and sold in 1921
, a Captain-class frigate in commission from 1943 to 1945

Royal Navy ship names